These are the official results of the Men's 100 metres event at the 2001 IAAF World Championships in Edmonton, Canada. There were a total number of 84 participating athletes, with eleven qualifying heats, five quarter-finals, two semi-finals and the final held on Sunday 5 August 2001 at 17:35h.

Medalists

Records

Final

Semi-final
Held on Sunday 5 August 2001

Quarter-finals
Held on Saturday 4 August 2001

Heats
Held on Saturday 4 August 2001

References
 Finals Results
 Semi-finals results
 Quarter-finals results
 Heats results

H
100 metres at the World Athletics Championships